Chapel Hill Independent School District is a public school district located in southeastern Titus County, Texas (USA).

The district has three schools on the same campus – Chapel Hill High (grades 9-12), Chapel Hill Junior High (grades 6-8), and Chapel Hill Elementary (grades K-5). The campus is located approximately  mile north of Northeast Texas Community College.

The principal for the elementary school is Misty Lake. The principal for the junior high school is Matt Dunn. The principal for the high school is Marcus Ysasi.

In 2009, the school district was rated "academically acceptable" by the Texas Education Agency.

References

External links

School districts in Titus County, Texas